The  Orlando Predators season was the 23rd season for the franchise in the Arena Football League. The team was coached by Rob Keefe, who was in his first season with the team. They played their home games at CFE Arena, located on the campus of the University of Central Florida, after Amway Center informed the team that they had defaulted on their lease with the arena for failing to meet attendance requirements.

Standings

Schedule

Regular season
The Predators began the season by hosting the Jacksonville Sharks on March 16. Their final regular season game was on July 26, at home against the Arizona Rattlers.

Playoffs

Final roster

References

Orlando Predators
Orlando Predators seasons
Orlando Predators
2010s in Orlando, Florida